Flood is a rural community in the District of Hope, British Columbia, Canada, located west of the town of Hope on the south bank of the Fraser River in the far eastern end of the Fraser Valley region.  It is primarily agricultural in nature.  Its official name is Floods, though it is usually referred to by its post office name in the singular, Flood.

See also 
Hope Aerodrome

References

Lower Mainland
Populated places in the Fraser Valley Regional District
Populated places on the Fraser River